Chiesa Nuova (Italian for "New Church") may refer to:

Chiesa Nuova, Rome or Santa Maria in Vallicella, a church in Rome, Italy
Chiesa Nuova (Rome Metro), a railway station
Chiesa Nuova, Assisi, a church in Assisi, Italy

See also 

 Chiesanuova (disambiguation)